Yello by Yello is a compilation album from Swiss electronic duo Yello. It was released on 5 November 2010 via Polydor label. There are two versions of the album:

 The singles collection 1980–2010 (1 CD and 1 DVD). This remastered album contains 20 tracks plus a new version of the song Vicious Games. It also includes a DVD with 23 videos from 1980–2009.
 The anthology box set (3 CDs and 1 DVD). This remastered box set contains The Singles Collection 1980–2010 and the two-CD The Anthology for which Dieter Meier and Boris Blank selected their favorite songs. A DVD with 23 videos and a 48-page booklet with photographs and personal commentary by Yello are included.

Some copies of The Singles Collection 1980–2010 have a production error. The song Lost Again (track 16) is missing, while the song Desire appears twice on the disc (tracks 16 and 20).

The Singles Collection 1980–2010
This disc is part of both versions of the album. It contains one new song: Vicious Games (2010).

The Anthology Vol. 1
This disc has only been released as part of the anthology box set. It contains three new songs: Dialectical Kid, Liquid Lies (2010), and Tears Run Dry.

Note: "Dialectical Kid" was later released on their 2016 album Toy.

The Anthology Vol. 2
This disc has only been released as part of the anthology box set. It contains no new songs.

References

Yello albums
2010 compilation albums
Polydor Records compilation albums